is a 2015 Japanese historical drama television series, the 54th NHK taiga drama. The series stars Mao Inoue as Sugi Fumi, a sister of Meiji Restoration scholar Yoshida Shōin. It premiered on January 4, 2015, and ended on December 13, 2015.

Plot
The series depict the Meiji Restoration, occurring during the last years of the Bakufu Shogunate and the early years of the Meiji Era, through the point of view of Sugi Fumi (ja), the younger sister of Yoshida Shōin.

Cast

Sugi family
Mao Inoue as Sugi Fumi (later Katori Miwako)
Momoka Yamada as young Fumi
Yusuke Iseya as Yoshida Shōin, Shishi of Bakumatsu era, Fumi's second eldest brother
Rihito Itagaki as young Shōin
Kyōzō Nagatsuka as Sugi Yurinosuke, Fumi's father
Fumi Dan as Sugi Taki, Fumi's mother
Eiji Okuda as Tamaki Bun'noshin, Fumi's uncle
Taizo Harada as Sugi Umetarō, Fumi's eldest brother
Yūka as Odamura Hisa, Fumi's second eldest sister, Odamura's first wife
Kanon as young Hisa
Yūki Morinaga as Sugi Toshisaburō, Fumi's younger brother

Odamura family
Takao Osawa as Odamura Inosuke (later Katori Motohiko), Fumi's second husband
Rino Katase as Odamura Shino, Inosuke's mother
Kanji Tsuda as Matsushima Gōzō, Inosuke's elder brother

Students of Shoka Sonjuku
Kengo Kora as Takasugi Shinsaku
Masahiro Higashide as Kusaka Genzui, Fumi's first husband
Kōji Seto as Yoshida Toshimaro
Hitori Gekidan as Itō Risuke (later Ito Hirobumi), the first prime minister of Japan
Ryūta Satō as Maebara Issei, leader of Hagi Rebellion
Jun Kaname as Irie Kuichi
Takurō Ōno as Nomura Yasushi

Chōshū Domain
Kin'ya Kitaōji as Mōri Takachika, the 13th daimyō of Chōshū
Takahiro Miura as Mōri Motonori, the last daimyō of Chōshū
Keiko Matsuzaka as Mōri Tomiko
Rena Tanaka as Mōri Yasuko
Takashi Naitō as Mukunashi Tōta
Mayumi Wakamura as Mukunashi Mitsuru
Noriyuki Higashiyama as Kido Takayoshi, one of the Three great nobles
Kanji Ishimaru as Sufu Masanosuke
Shinji Yamashita as Kijima Matabei
Masanori Ishii as Inoue Kaoru
Tasuku Nagaoka as Yamagata Aritomo
Yūto Ichioka as Ōmura Masujirō
Mizuki Itagaki as Mōri Motoakira

Okugoten

Okugoten is the harem (oku) of Chōshū Domain.

Kayoko Shiraishi as Kunishima
Guin Poon Chaw as Sonoyama, director of Okugoten
Anna Ishibashi as Mari
Machiko Washio as Ushio
Noriko Eguchi as Hinode
Yumiko Takahashi as Shino
Rina Ikoma (Nogizaka46)
Nanase Nishino (Nogizaka46)
Mai Shiraishi (Nogizaka46)
Nanami Hashimoto (Nogizaka46)
Erika Ikuta (Nogizaka46)
Kazumi Takayama (Nogizaka46)
Yumi Wakatsuki (Nogizaka46)
Reika Sakurai (Nogizaka46)
Mai Fukagawa (Nogizaka46)
Manatsu Akimoto (Nogizaka46)

Satsuma Domain
Takayuki Takuma as Saigō Takamori, one of the Three great nobles
Naoto Eguchi (Dobu Rock) as Shimazu Hisamitsu

Tosa Domain
Tsuyoshi Ihara as Sakamoto Ryōma

Tokugawa shogunate
Shintarō Mori (Dobu Rock) as Tokugawa Yoshinobu
Hideki Takahashi as Ii Naosuke
Ryuichi Isozaki as Matsudaira Shungaku

Shinsengumi
Masaya Nakamura as Kondō Isami
Kento Kaku as Okita Sōji

Aizu Domain
Takehiko Fujita as Matsudaira Katamori

Foreigners
Lee Longshaw as Townsend Harris
Mark Chinnery as Samuel Wells Williams
John Ohkuma as Thomas Blake Glover

Others
Haruka Igawa as Takasu Hisako
Umika Kawashima as Takasu Ito
Hirotarō Honda as Tominaga Yūrin
Kento Miyahara as a sumo wrestler
Anne Suzuki as Tatsuji
Mitsuru Hirata as Dr. Yamane Bunki
Yuina Kuroshima as Takasugi Masa, Shinsaku's wife
George Yamamoto as Shiraishi Shōichirō
Akiko Hinagata as Ikumatsu, Takayoshi's wife
Tōru Emori as Akuzawa Gonzō, official of Gunma prefecture
Yoshiko Mita as Akuzawa Sei
Shunsuke Daito as Hoshino Chōtarō
Yoshihiko Hosoda as Arai Ryōichirō
Kazuyuki Aijima as Suzuki Eitarō
Hiroyuki Onoue as Kudō Chōjirō
Masako Miyaji as Tome
Yoshizumi Ishihara as Funatsu Denjibei, one of "Three agricultural professionals of Meiji"
Takamasa Suga as Murakami Tsunehisa
Kurara Chibana as Tsuda Umeko
Kisuke Iida as Saigō Jūdō
Eri Fuse as Mrs. Sagano
Atsuko Sakurai as Mrs. Iketani
Fumina Hara as Mrs. Sakata
Karen Miyazaki as Irie Sumi
Fujiko Kojima as Yoshida Fusa
Anna Yamada as Hisa's friend

Production

Music – Kenji Kawai
Titling – Tomomi Kunishige
Historical research – Manabu Ōishi, Tōru Umihara, Tsugunobu Miyake
Sword fight arranger - Kunishirō Hayashi
Architectural research – Kiyoshi Hirai
Clothing research – Kiyoko Koizumi
Narrator – Shūichi Ikeda
PR character – Moyurun (voiced by Haruka Tomatsu)

See also

Bakumatsu
Meiji Restoration

References

External links

  at NHK (in Japanese)
  at NEP Program Finder (in English)
 

2015 Japanese television series debuts
2015 Japanese television series endings
Taiga drama
Television series set in the 1850s
Television series set in the 1860s
Television shows set in Gunma Prefecture
Television shows set in Yamaguchi Prefecture